Chongsheng Temple is a Buddhist temple located at the foot of Mount Xuefeng in Dahu Township, Minhou County, Fujian, China.

The oldest things in the temple are two 1000-year-old Tamarix chinensis trees, which were supposed planted by founding master Yicun and Wang Shenzhi.

History

According to Song-dynasty Biographies of Eminent Monks and Record of the Transmission of the Lamp, the temple was originally built as "Yingtian Xuefeng Chan Temple" in 870 by Chan master Yicun (822–908), under the Tang dynasty (618–907). His disciples Yunmen Wenyan and Fayan Shibei founded Yunmen school and Fayan school respectively.

In 978, in the 3rd year of Taiping Xingguo in the Song dynasty (960–1279), Emperor Taizong honored the name "Xuefeng Chongsheng Chan Temple", which has been used to date.

Chongsheng Temple underwent two renovations in the Ming and Qing dynasties, respectively in the 2nd year of Yongle Emperor's reign (1404) by abbot Fa'an and in the ruling of Guangxu Emperor (1887) by abbot Daben.

In 1928, Yuan Ying, a prominent Buddhist monk, was unanimously chosen as the new abbot of Chongsheng Temple. He supervised the reconstruction of Chongsheng Temple.
In 1937, after the Marco Polo Bridge Incident, the Second Sino-Japanese War broke out. Chongsheng Temple was subjected to bombardment during wars between Nationalists and the Imperial Japanese Army.

After the 3rd Plenary Session of the 11th Central Committee of the Communist Party of China, the policy of religious freedom was implemented. In 1979 the local government restored and rebuilt Chongsheng Temple on the original site.   It has been designated as a National Key Buddhist Temple in Han Chinese Area by the State Council of China in 1983.

Architecture
The complex include the following halls: Shanmen, Mahavira Hall, Hall of Four Heavenly Kings, Hall of Guanyin, Bell tower, Drum tower, Hall of Guru, Dharma Hall, Meditation Hall, Reception Hall, Dining Room, etc.

References

Buddhist temples in Fuzhou
Buildings and structures in Fuzhou
Tourist attractions in Fuzhou
1979 establishments in China
20th-century Buddhist temples
Religious buildings and structures completed in 1979